Spaced Out Bunny is a Warner Bros. cartoon starring Bugs Bunny and Marvin the Martian. The cartoon was part of the television special Bugs Bunny's Bustin' Out All Over on CBS, which aired May 21, 1980.

Spaced Out Bunny is one of the four Bugs Bunny cartoons produced during 1979–1980, the first new shorts since 1964's False Hare. Spaced Out Bunny would also be the last Warner Brothers-released short to have Mel Blanc voicing Bugs.

Plot 
While walking in a forest, Bugs Bunny declares that although many others are out to get each other, he is at peace with all; this is illustrated as Bugs' interacts with, among other things, a flower, a rock, a butterfly, and a tree. He then sees a carrot at the end of a line and begins to eat it, unaware that it is bait set by Marvin the Martian who hauls Bugs into his flying saucer, where Bugs falls into a deep sleep which Marvin explains is because the carrot is an "ACME Super Rack and Pinion Tranquilizer Carrot." which that Bugs ate puts him to sleep. Marvin's purpose is to provide a playmate for Hugo the Abominable Snowman (from 1961's The Abominable Snow Rabbit). Marvin carries Bugs out of his ship and places him by the space tree. When Bugs woke up he starts to realize where he is, Marvin tells him that he is on Mars and explains his rationale before turning Hugo loose on Bugs ("Oh no, not again!" cries Bugs). The rest of the cartoon has similarities to Snow Rabbit, including Hugo's expressed intention to "hug him and stroke him and cuddle him and sing to him and call him George." Bugs regains the upper hand on his captors by suggesting to Hugo that he wants a robot, not a rabbit; Marvin attempts to make a getaway, but Hugo reaches into the spaceship and repeats his lines. When Marvin demands that Hugo cease his behavior and states that he is not a robot, Hugo spanks him. Bugs then whispers in Hugo's ear. The scene cuts to Hugo's wrist, where he proudly displays his new "Mickey Mouse" wristwatch, with Marvin on the dial. Bugs then climbs into the spacecraft and gets Hugo to practice his Frisbee toss by hurling the ship toward the Earth.

References

External links 
 

1980 television films
1980 films
1980 animated films
1980 short films
1980s American animated films
1980s Warner Bros. animated short films
Merrie Melodies short films
American television films
Films about Yeti
Bugs Bunny films
Marvin the Martian films